Apostolepis lineata, the hognose lineate blackhead, is a species of snake in the family Colubridae. It is endemic to Brazil.

References 

lineata
Reptiles described in 1887
Reptiles of Brazil
Taxa named by Edward Drinker Cope